Nijinsky is a 1980 American biographical film directed by Herbert Ross. Hugh Wheeler wrote a screenplay that explores the later life and career of Vaslav Nijinsky; it was based largely on the premier danseur's personal diaries (a bowdlerized 1936 version was edited and published by his wife, Romola de Pulszky), and her 1934 biography of Nijinsky, largely ghostwritten by Lincoln Kirstein, who later co-founded the New York City Ballet.

Plot
The film suggests Nijinsky was driven into madness by both his consuming ambition and self-enforced heterosexuality. He became involved with Romola de Pulszky, a society girl who joined impresario Sergei Diaghilev's Ballets Russes specifically to seduce Nijinsky. After a series of misunderstandings with Diaghilev, who is both his domineering mentor and possessive lover, Nijinsky succumbs to Romola's charms and marries her. After this, his gradual decline from artistic moodiness to a diagnosis of schizophrenia begins.

Principal cast

Alan Bates ..... Sergei Diaghilev 
George de la Peña ..... Vaslav Nijinsky 
Leslie Browne ..... Romola de Pulsky 
Carla Fracci ..... Tamara Karsavina 
Ronald Pickup ..... Igor Stravinsky 
Vernon Dobtcheff ..... Sergei Grigoriev 
Frederick Jaeger ..... Gabriel Astruc 
Janet Suzman ..... Emilia Marcus 
Siân Phillips ..... Lady Ripon
Alan Badel ..... Baron de Gunzburg 
Colin Blakely ..... Vassili 
Ronald Lacey ..... Léon Bakst 
Jeremy Irons ..... Mikhail Fokine 
Anton Dolin ..... Maestro Cecchetti 
Hetty Baynes ..... Magda

Principal production credits 
 
Producers ..... Harry Saltzman, Nora Kaye
Musical Conductor ..... John Lanchbery
Cinematography ..... Douglas Slocombe
Production Design ..... John Blezard
Art Direction ..... George Richardson 
Costume Design ..... Alan Barrett
Ballet mistress ..... Irina Baronova

Soundtrack 

"Invitation to the Dance" from Le Spectre de la Rose by Carl Maria von Weber
Scheherazade by Nikolai Rimsky-Korsakov
Prelude à l'Après-midi d'un faune by Claude Debussy
Jeux by Claude Debussy
Carnaval by Robert Schumann
The Rite of Spring by Igor Stravinsky
Prince Igor by Alexander Borodin
Petrushka by Igor Stravinsky

Production notes
 Harry Saltzman purchased the rights in 1969 from film director Charles Vidor's widow. Saltzman had originally promised to let Ken Russell direct the film, but due to a falling out, Saltzman hired Tony Richardson to direct. The film was canceled during pre-production. After the success of Herbert Ross's ballet film The Turning Point, Saltzman approached Ross to direct; Ross was initially unenthusiastic.
 This was Herbert Ross' second film to focus on the world of ballet. In his 1977 film he had worked with Mikhail Baryshnikov and other members of the American Ballet Theatre. Baryshnikov turned down the role of Vaslav Nijinsky as the American Ballet Theatre had promoted him to the role of Artistic Director. 
 Nijinsky was the film debut of Jeremy Irons. It was the second to last film produced by Harry Saltzman. 
 The Los Angeles Philharmonic Orchestra and the London Festival Ballet were featured in the dance sequences. David Hersey of the National Film Theatre in London designed the theatrical lighting in these scenes.

Critical reception
Reception to Nijinsky is mixed. 

In his review in Time, Richard Schickel opined, "Some people will be titillated by the openness with which homosexual love is portrayed in the film. But this is mostly a slow, cautious biography, elegantly attentive to Edwardian decor and dress. It slights Nijinsky's melodramatic story and, finally, offends with its relentless reductionism. There are times when excesses of good taste become a kind of bad taste, a falsification of a subject's spirit and milieu. This is never more true than when the troubles of a genius are presented in boring and conventional terms."

Time Out London calls it "the best gay weepie since Death in Venice … the first major studio film to centre on a male homosexual relationship (albeit a doomed one) without being moralistic … director Ross and writer Hugh Wheeler … do right by their male characters (Alan Bates, in particular, is a plausibly adult Diaghilev), their grasp of the historical reconstructions seems more than competent, and their dialogue and exposition are unusually adroit. Best of all, they never show ballet for its own sake, and have the courage to keep emotional dynamics in the forefront throughout."

Channel 4 says, "What could have been a powerful period drama quickly descends into soap opera territory … but it's always watchable, and director Ross … laces the action with some well-choregraphed dance."

Director Tony Richardson, who had intended to direct the planned 1970 film on Nijinsky, considered this 1980 film a "travesty".

References

External links

1980 films
1980 LGBT-related films
1980s biographical drama films
American biographical drama films
American LGBT-related films
Films about ballet
1980s English-language films
Films directed by Herbert Ross
Films set in 1912
Films set in 1913
Films set in Budapest
Films set in Buenos Aires
Films set in Genoa
Films set in Greece
Films set in Italy
Films set in London
Films set in Monaco
Films set in Paris
Films set in Switzerland
Films shot at Pinewood Studios
Films produced by Harry Saltzman
Cultural depictions of Igor Stravinsky
1980 drama films
Paramount Pictures films
Biographical films about dancers
1980s American films
Biographical films about LGBT people